Pride and Joy may refer to:

Music
 "Pride and Joy" (Marvin Gaye song),  1963
 "Pride and Joy" (Stevie Ray Vaughan song), 1983
 Pride and Joy (Stevie Ray Vaughan video), 1990
 "Pride N Joy", a song by Fat Joe, 2012
 “Pride and Joy”, a song by Brandi Carlile from her 2009 album Give Up the Ghost
 "Pride and Joy", a song by David Coverdale and Jimmy Page from their 1993 album Coverdale–Page

Other uses
 "Pride & Joy" (comics), a 2003 Runaways story arc
 Pride & Joy (Vertigo), a 2003 comic book mini-series by Garth Ennis and John Higgins
 Pride & Joy (TV series), a 1995 American sitcom
 "Pride & Joy" (The Crown), a 2016 television episode
 Pride and joy: children's portraits in the Netherlands, 1500–1700, a 2000–2001 art exhibit